is a private junior college in Nagaokakyo, Kyoto, Japan, established in 1950. The present name was adopted in 2004.

External links
 Official website 

Japanese junior colleges
Educational institutions established in 1950
Private universities and colleges in Japan
Universities and colleges in Kyoto Prefecture
1950 establishments in Japan